Poděvousy is a municipality and village in Domažlice District in the Plzeň Region of the Czech Republic. It has about 200 inhabitants.

Geography
It lies on the border between the Švihov Highlands and Plasy Uplands.

History
The first written mention of Poděvousy is from 1115. Despite an unclear history, experts conclude early Feudal origin of the village. After creating a new system of political governance in 1850, it became an independent municipality.

References

Villages in Domažlice District